The Landmark Inn is a historic hotel on Front Street in downtown Marquette, Michigan. The hotel originally opened in 1930 as the Hotel Northland. As it originally did, the hotel operates as a full-service hotel with 66 rooms, many of which overlook the shores of Lake Superior.

History
Building plans and concept work on the hotel started in June 1916 and were overseen by Samuel Shackford Otis. Construction on Hotel Northland began with foundation pouring in 1920 but was quickly halted due to lack of funding. After George Shiras III and the stockholders of the Kambawgam Hotel Co. had raised the $35,0000 (equivalent to $ in ) necessary to build the hotel, construction resumed 12 years later on April 1, 1929.  Hotel Northland officially opened to guests on January 2, 1930. 

Through the 1970s, the hotel fell into a severe state of disrepair. The deterioration of the building and a series of rapid name changes (including "Heritage House" in the mid-1970s and "Old Marquette Inn" in 1978) ultimately lead to its closure in 1982, after which it was considered abandoned.

In 1995, the hotel property was purchased by Christine and Bruce Pesola for $103,000 (equivalent to $ in ) and in that same year, a complete renovation of the building began. After renovation efforts were finished in 1997, the newly restored hotel was reopened as the Landmark Inn.

Popular culture
Throughout its history, the hotel has hosted many celebrities and historical figures including: Amelia Earhart in 1932, Abbott & Costello in 1942, astronaut Jerry Lineger, and Maya Angelou. The hotel also hosted the cast and crew of the film Anatomy of a Murder, including James Stewart and Lee Remick during filming in 1959.

Current use
The hotel has been owned by Graves Hospitality Management since 2015. The Landmark Inn operates 66 rooms, many of which are now named in coordination to the celebrities and historical figures that have stayed in each respective room. For a number of years, the Landmark Inn was a member of Historic Hotels of America, the official program of the National Trust for Historic Preservation; the hotel left the program in 2016.

References

External links
 

Buildings and structures in Marquette, Michigan
Hotels in Michigan
Hotel buildings completed in 1930
Hotels established in 1930
Historic Hotels of America